Reflex Records was an American independent record label formed by the members of hardcore punk band Hüsker Dü and Terry Katzman. It was formed to help promote independent bands, after Twin/Tone Records rejected Hüsker Dü's first single in 1979. (Bassist Greg Norton told Rolling Stone in 2017 that the label was named after their experience with Twin/Tone: “We named our label Reflex Records because that was our reflex to being rejected.”)

The label was funded by a loan from Hüsker drummer Grant Hart's mother's credit union.

Under Katzman's guidance, the label would also release several compilations of regional underground and alternative bands, as well as albums by local post-punk bands Rifle Sport, Man Sized Action, Otto's Chemical Lounge, and Articles of Faith, as well as the Minutemen's 1985 EP Tour-Spiel.

Both Katzman and the Hüsker Dü members became too busy with other projects, and the label quietly folded in 1985.

In 2008, Hart revived the Reflex name to issue a three-song live CD by Hüsker Dü recorded in 1982-83 featuring their friend John Clegg on saxophone, Live Featuring J.C.

Reflex Records discography
Hüsker Dü, "Statues" b/w "Amusement" 7" single (1981)
Barefoot and Pregnant cassette compilation (1982)
Kitten cassette compilation (1982)
Hüsker Dü, Everything Falls Apart 12" LP (1983)
Rifle Sport, Voice of Reason 12" LP (1983)
Man Sized Action, Claustrophobia 12" LP (1983)
Final Conflict, Final Conflict 7" four-song EP (1983)
Ground Zero, Ground Zero 12" LP (1983)
Articles of Faith, Give Thanks 12" LP (1983)
Man Sized Action, Five-Story Garage 12" LP (1984)
Ground Zero, Pink 12" LP (1985)
Minutemen, Tour-Spiel 7" four-song EP (1985)
Hüsker Dü, Live Featuring J.C. (2008)

References

Record labels established in 1979
Record labels disestablished in 1985
American independent record labels
Independent record labels based in Minnesota
Alternative rock record labels
Defunct companies based in Minneapolis
Indie rock record labels